Robert Willems (born 6 May 1935) is a Belgian footballer. He played in one match for the Belgium national football team in 1965.

References

External links
 

1935 births
Living people
Belgian footballers
Belgium international footballers
Place of birth missing (living people)
Association footballers not categorized by position